Sari Su (also Romanized as Sārī Sū; also known as Sarasu) is a village in Chaybasar-e Sharqi Rural District, in the Central District of Poldasht County, West Azerbaijan Province, Iran. At the 2006 census, its population was 234, in 42 families.

References 

Populated places in Poldasht County